The 2019 Mid Sussex District Council election took place on Thursday 2 May 2019 to elect members of Mid Sussex District Council in West Sussex, England.

After the election, the composition of the council was as follows:

 Conservative 34
 Liberal Democrat 13
 Green 3
 Independent 4

Summary

Election result

|-

Ward results

Ardingly and Balcombe

Ashurst Wood

Bolney

Burgess Hill Dunstall

Burgess Hill Franklands

Burgess Hill Leylands

Burgess Hill Meeds

Burgess Hill St. Andrew's

Burgess Hill Victoria

Copthorne and Worth

Crawley Down and Turners Hill

Cuckfield

East Grinstead Ashplats

East Grinstead Baldwins

East Grinstead Herontye

East Grinstead Imberhorne

East Grinstead Town

Hassocks

Haywards Heath Ashenground

Haywards Heath Bentswood

Haywards Heath Heath

Haywards Heath Franklands

Haywards Heath Lucastes

High Weald

Hurstpierpoint and Downs

Lindfield

By-elections

Copthorne and Worth

Ardingly and Balcombe

Bolney

References

May 2019 events in the United Kingdom
2019 English local elections
2019
2010s in West Sussex